The ambassador of the United Kingdom to East Timor is the United Kingdom's foremost diplomatic representative to the Democratic Republic of Timor-Leste. The official title is His Britannic Majesty's Ambassador to the Democratic Republic of Timor-Leste. The British Embassy in Dili was opened in 2002 when East Timor (as it is called in English) became independent of Indonesia, and closed in July 2006 along with British Embassies and High Commissions in several other countries; since 2006 the UK has been represented in East Timor by the Ambassador to Indonesia.

List of heads of mission

Ambassador to East Timor
2002–2004: Hamish Daniel
2004–2006: Tina Redshaw
2006 onwards: see List of ambassadors of the United Kingdom to Indonesia

External links
UK in Timor-Leste

East Timor
United Kingdom
Ambassadors of the United Kingdom to East Timor